This is a list of the National Register of Historic Places listings in Grant County, Wisconsin. It is intended to provide a comprehensive listing of entries in the National Register of Historic Places that are located in Grant County, Wisconsin.  The locations of National Register properties for which the latitude and longitude coordinates are included below may be seen in a map.

There are 36 properties and districts listed on the National Register in the county.

Current listings

 and the 1905 American Foursquare Grindell house.

|}

See also

List of National Historic Landmarks in Wisconsin
National Register of Historic Places listings in Wisconsin
Listings in neighboring counties: Clayton (IA), Crawford, Dubuque (IA), Iowa, Jo Daviess (IL), Lafayette, Richland

References

 
Grant